René Theo van Dieren (born 12 March 1981) is a Dutch former professional footballer.

Club career
His former clubs are Fortuna Sittard, Feyenoord, Excelsior, AGOVV Apeldoorn and Sparta Rotterdam. He finished his career at FC Lienden in the Dutch Topklasse.

International career
He was a member of the Dutch squad at the 2001 FIFA World Youth Championship and the 2013 FIFA Beach Soccer World Cup.

References

External links
  Voetbal International profile
  VoetbalFocus

1981 births
Living people
People from Naarden
Association football midfielders
Dutch footballers
Netherlands youth international footballers
Dutch beach soccer players
Feyenoord players
Fortuna Sittard players
Excelsior Rotterdam players
AGOVV Apeldoorn players
Sparta Rotterdam players
FC Lienden players
Eredivisie players
Eerste Divisie players
Derde Divisie players
Footballers from North Holland